Averky is a Russian Christian male first name. The name is possibly derived from the Latin word averto, meaning to rout, to hold, to turn away, or to attract, but it is more likely that the name is a Russified version of Abercius, a well-known saint venerated by Orthodox Christians. Its colloquial variants are Averyan, Avery, and Overky.

The diminutives of "Averky" are Avera, Averya, Vera, Averyanka, and Yana.

The patronymics derived from "Averky" are "" (Averkiyevich; masculine) and its colloquial form "" (Averkich), and "" (Averkiyevna; feminine). The patronymics derived from "Averyan" are "" (Averyanovich; masculine) and its colloquial form "" (Averyanych), and "" (Averyanovna; feminine). The patronymics derived from "Avery" are "" (Averyevich; masculine) and its colloquial form "" (Averich), and "" (Averyanovna; feminine).

Last names derived from this first name and its variants include Averkiyev, Averin, and Averyanov.

References

Notes

Sources
[1] А. В. Суперанская (A. V. Superanskaya). "Современный словарь личных имён: Сравнение. Происхождение. Написание" (Modern Dictionary of First Names: Comparison. Origins. Spelling). Айрис-пресс. Москва, 2005. 
[2] А. В. Суперанская (A. V. Superanskaya). "Словарь русских имён" (Dictionary of Russian Names). Издательство Эксмо. Москва, 2005. 
Н. А. Петровский (N. A. Petrovsky). "Словарь русских личных имён" (Dictionary of Russian First Names). ООО Издательство "АСТ". Москва, 2005. 
Ю. А. Федосюк (Yu. A. Fedosyuk). "Русские фамилии: популярный этимологический словарь" (Russian Last Names: a Popular Etymological Dictionary). Москва, 2006. 

